Marcos Antonio Falopa, commonly known as Marcos Falopa (born 2 April 1949), is a Brazilian football manager. Falopa, who played for Palmeiras and Sao Caetano, is a qualified adviser and coaching instructor accredited by FIFA. Having graduated with a bachelor's degree in Sports & Physical Education, Falopa also earned a master's degree in Football from the University of São Paulo, and a UEFA Pro Coaching License (A). He has more than 35 years of experience in football.

Career as a player
Marcos Falopa grew up in São Paulo, where he played futsal professionally from 1961 to 1963 before moving on to football. He was a professional in Botafogo’s B team in Rio de Janeiro before moving to Sao Caetano in the first division, where he played from 1970 to 1971.

Career as manager and technical director

Early career
After retiring, he enrolled at University of São Paulo and trained to become a coach. Since then, he has visited more than 100 countries to teach football. His most prominent coaching assignment was during 1986 through 1988, when he was the assistant manager of Brazil's national team. In 1995, Jack Warner hired Marcos Falopa to the position of CONCACAF Technical Director.

South Africa, Oman, and Myanmar
On 30 October 2002 he was appointed as the technical director of the South African Football Association with a four-year contract. However, he resigned the post in 2004.

On 24 July 2005 he became the manager of Oman's under-17 national team with a one-year contract. In April 2007, he became the manager of the Myanmar national football team. During his regime, Myanmar's national team triumphed in the six-country Third Grand Royal Challenge Cup soccer tournament, hosted by Myanmar in November 2008, one year after finishing runners-up in both the 39th Merdeka football tournament in Malaysia in August 2007 and the 24th Southeast Asian (SEA) Games in Thailand in December 2007. His contract ended in December 2008.

East Bengal
On 12 June 2013 he succeeded Trevor Morgan as the manager of East Bengal ahead of John van Loen and Rodolfo Zapata. He was assisted by his son Americo Falopa as the goalkeeping coach and physical trainer. His first assignment was to maintain the club's winning run in the AFC Cup. He was also approached by rivals Mohun Bagan to become the technical director of their youth academy. The father-son duo joined the team, known by their colours, Red and Gold, in July.

He won his first match against Semen Padang of Indonesia in the 2013 AFC Cup semi-final, maintaining the team's winning streak.

Falopa resigned from his position at East Bengal on 13 November 2013; Armando Colaco replaced him the next day.

Barbados
Falopa was appointed coach of the Barbados team in 2014 and remained there a year, until his resignation following the embarrassing face elimination in Aruba in the second round of qualifying for the FIFA World Cup 2018.

References

1949 births
Living people
Brazilian men's futsal players
Brazilian football managers
Al-Khor SC managers
Santos FC managers
Nagoya Grampus managers
East Bengal Club managers
Al Shabab FC (Riyadh) managers
Expatriate football managers in Japan
Expatriate football managers in Qatar
Expatriate football managers in Myanmar
Myanmar national football team managers
Expatriate football managers in Bahrain
Expatriate football managers in Saudi Arabia
Expatriate football managers in Barbados
Expatriate football managers in India
Brazilian expatriate football managers
Brazilian expatriate sportspeople in Bahrain
Brazilian expatriate sportspeople in Barbados
Brazilian expatriate sportspeople in Saudi Arabia
Brazilian expatriate sportspeople in Qatar
Brazilian expatriate sportspeople in Myanmar